"Amazing Grace" is a Christian hymn.

Amazing Grace may also refer to:

Film and television 
Amazing Grace (1974 film), a comedy film by Stan Lathan
Amazing Grace (1992 film), a film by Amos Guttman dealing with LGBT issues and AIDS in Israeli society
Amazing Grace (2006 film), a film by Michael Apted about the campaign against slave trade in the British Empire, led by William Wilberforce
The Amazing Grace, a 2006 film by Jeta Amata about the British slave trader John Newton
Amazing Grace: Jeff Buckley, a 2009 documentary film
Amazing Grace (2018 film), a documentary by Sydney Pollack about Aretha Franklin
Amazing Grace (American TV series), a 1995 American drama series
Amazing Grace (Australian TV series), a 2021 drama series
"Amazing Grace" (Legends of Tomorrow), an episode of Legends of Tomorrow

Literature
Amazing Grace (comics), a fictional supervillain in DC Comics
Amazing Grace (novel), a 2007 novel by Danielle Steel
 Amazing Grace: An Anthology of Poems about Slavery, 2002
 Amazing Grace, a children's book by Mary Hoffman

Music

Albums
Amazing Grace (Aretha Franklin album), 1972
Amazing Grace (The Badlees album), 1999
Amazing Grace (Judy Collins album), 1985
Amazing Grace (Sissel album), 1994
Amazing Grace (Spiritualized album), 2003
Amazing Grace: His Greatest Sacred Performances, by Elvis Presley, 1999
Amazing Grace: Songs for Christmas, an EP by Paulini, 2004
Amazing Grace (score), composed by David Arnold, from the 2006 Michael Apted film, 2007
Amazing Grace (soundtrack), by various artists, from the Michael Apted film, 2007

Songs
"Amazing Grace (Used to Be Her Favorite Song)", by Amazing Rhythm Aces, 1975
"Amazing Grace (My Chains Are Gone)", a reworking of the hymn, by Chris Tomlin from See the Morning, 2006
"Amazing Grace", a song by Boy George from Ordinary Alien, 2010
"Amazing Grace", a song by DaBaby from Blame It on Baby, 2020

Other uses 
 Amazing Grace (musical), a 2015 Broadway musical
 Amazing Grace (ship), a topsail schooner
 Amazing Grace Church, a bilingual Christian church in Fujisawa, Kanagawa, Japan
 Grace Hopper or Amazing Grace (1906–1992), American computer scientist and naval officer
 Grace McCarthy or Amazing Grace (1927–2017), Canadian politician

See also
Amazing Grace and Chuck, a 1987 film by Mike Newell